The 2021–22 Minnesota Golden Gophers men's ice hockey season was the 101st season of play for the program. They represented the University of Minnesota in the 2021–22 NCAA Division I men's ice hockey season. This season marked the 32nd season in the Big Ten Conference. They were coached by Bob Motzko, in his fourth season, and played their home games at 3M Arena at Mariucci.

Season
Minnesota came into the season ranked 4th in both preseason polls. The lofty expectations were due mostly to the quality of returning players, which included starting goaltender and co-captain, Jack LaFontaine who was the reigning Mike Richter Award winner. In addition, Minnesota added five NHL-drafted players to their roster. Despite the prognostications, The Gophers got off to a less-than-stellar start. The team swept their opening weekend in spite of a sloppy defensive effort and followed that up- by playing .500 hockey for two months. The Minnesota offense showed up on most nights but, surprisingly, it was LaFontaine who appeared to be the team's biggest problem. The team's starter was inconsistent for the first half of the year, rarely posting consecutive games with solid results.

By the time Christmas rolled around, Minnesota was just 2 games above .500 and were in the middle of the Big Ten standings. The only saving grace for the team was their strength of schedule. Due to playing three top-10 non-conference teams, as well as three other ranked clubs within their conference, Minnesota was still on pace to earn a bid to the NCAA tournament.

The Gophers opened the second half of their season with a sweep over lowly Michigan State but then suffered a massive loss. On January 9 Jack LaFontaine, who had played all but 28 minutes in goal for the team to that point, signed a profession contract with the Carolina Hurricanes and ended his college career. Minnesota was forced to turn to junior Justen Close, who hadn't started a game in three years. The defense rallied around the Saskatchewan native and kept him insulated for several games as he got used to his new role on the team. Close managed to break even for the remainder of January even while playing two tournament-bound teams.

Once the calendar turned to February, Close began looking like a top-flight goalie and he backstopped the Gophers to their best performance all season. Though they had lost Brock Faber, Ben Meyers and Matthew Knies to the US Olympic team, Minnesota won their final eight regular season games and shot up both the standings and the rankings. In their final weekend before the playoffs, Minnesota shut out long time rival Wisconsin twice in the same weekend. The last time that had happened was in 1934, over 88 years earlier. The winning streak placed Minnesota atop the conference standings and gave the Gophers a bye into the Big Ten semifinals.

Postseason
Minnesota remained at home and welcomed an upstart Penn State team to Mariucci. Despite having not played in two weeks, the Gophers got out to a 2-goal lead early in the second period. The Nittany Lions, however, stormed back to tie the game. Close held the fort in the third, giving co-Captain Sammy Walker the time he needed to score the winning goal. The team then faced Michigan for the title and while both teams were already guaranteed appearances in the NCAA tournament, they were fighting for more than just pride. Jaxon Nelson opened the scoring just 32 seconds into the game but that was the high point for the Gophers. The Wolverines scored four times over the next 30 minutes and took a commanding lead. As the clock ticked, Minnesota was unable to generate anything on the scoresheet until Michigan was handed a pair of penalties near the end of regulation. The Gophers scored on both powerplays, cutting the lead to just a single goal, but the second marker came with just 5 seconds left. Minnesota's comeback started just a bit too late and the Gophers were forced to watch Michigan celebrate a championship.

NCAA tournament
The loss caused Minnesota to drop just enough to receive a #2 seed in the tournament and were set against the defending national champion, Massachusetts. Early on it looked to be a bad match for the Gophers when UMass scored twice in the first but a late goal by Ryan Johnson got Minnesota back in the game before the period was over. After trading goals in the second, Knies knotted the score a 3-all in the third period and the two teams fought to a draw after 60 minutes. The Gophers traded chances with the Minutemen in overtime with the other co-Captain, Meyers, netting the winner on a pass from Aaron Huglen.

In the second round, Minnesota looked dominant against Western Michigan and shut down one of the strongest offenses in the nation. While the Gophers weren't particularly outstanding offensively, Close stopped all 24 shots that came his way and his third shutout of the season sent Minnesota to the frozen four.

Their semifinal opponent, Minnesota State, was the same team that had knocked Minnesota out of the tournament the year before. Unfortunately for the Gophers, they weren't able to produce a different result. After Knies opened the scoring, the Mavericks ran roughshod over the Maroon and Gold and scored the final 5 goals of the game. Though the finale was Minnesota's worst loss all season, the team was still one of the last four teams standing and could take pride in reaching the program's 22nd national semifinal.

Departures

Recruiting

Roster
As of April 21, 2021.

Standings

Schedule and results

|-
!colspan=12 style=";" | Regular season

|-
!colspan=12 style=";" | 

|-
!colspan=12 style=";" |

Scoring statistics

Goaltending statistics

Rankings

Note: USCHO did not release a poll in week 24.

Awards and honors

Players drafted into the NHL

2022 NHL Entry Draft

† incoming freshman

References

External links

Minnesota Golden Gophers men's ice hockey seasons
Minnesota
Minnesota
Minnesota
Minnesota
Minnesota